Cyprus participated in the Eurovision Song Contest 2019 with the song "Replay" written by Alex Papaconstantinou, Teddy Sky, Viktor Svensson, Albin Nedler, and Kristoffer Fogelmark. The song was performed by Georgian-Greek singer Tamta.

Background

Prior to the 2019 contest, Cyprus had participated in the Eurovision Song Contest thirty-five times since the island country made their debut in the 1981 contest. Their best placing to this point was second, in the previous year's contest with the song "" performed by Eleni Foureira. Cyprus' least successful result was in 1986 when it placed last with the song "" by Elpida, receiving only four points in total. However, its worst finish in terms of points received was when it placed second to last in the 1999 contest with "" by Marlain Angelidou, receiving only two points. After returning to the contest in 2015 following their one-year absence from the 2014 edition due to the 2012–13 Cypriot financial crisis and the broadcaster's budget restrictions, Cyprus has managed to qualify for the grand final in all of the contests in which they have participated.

The Cypriot national broadcaster, Cyprus Broadcasting Corporation (CyBC), broadcasts the event within Cyprus and organises the selection process for the nation's entry. CyBC confirmed their intentions to participate at the Eurovision Song Contest 2018 on 22 August 2017. Cyprus has used various methods to select the Cypriot entry in the past, such as internal selections and televised national finals to choose the performer, song or both to compete at Eurovision. In 2015, the broadcaster organised the national final Eurovision Song Project, which featured 54 songs competing in a nine-week-long process resulting in the selection of the Cypriot entry through the combination of public televoting and the votes from an expert jury. However, since 2016, CyBC has opted to select the artist and song internally.

Before Eurovision

Internal selection
On 21 December 2018, it was announced by CyBC that Greek-Georgian singer Tamta would represent the country with the song "Replay", which would be presented in February 2019. Tamta had attempted to enter Eurovision in 2007 with the song "With Love" but placed third in the Greek national final. She also approached Greek broadcaster ERT to represent Greece since 2010, but ERT declined the offer. She was also rumored to be the Cypriot representative for 2018, but later declined because of prior commitments. CyBC, in collaboration with label Minos-EMI/Universal, initially planned to host the show Eurovision Cocktail Party on 5 March for the presentation of the Cypriot entry, however, it was instead presented during a newscast on CyBC on 5 March. Nevertheless, Eurovision Cocktail Party was still aired, but later on 2 April 2019.

At Eurovision 
The Eurovision Song Contest 2019 took place at Expo Tel Aviv in Tel Aviv, Israel. It consisted of two semi-finals held on 14 and 16 May, respectively, and the grand final on 18 May 2019. The European Broadcasting Union (EBU) split up the competing countries into six different pots based on voting patterns from previous contests, with countries with favourable voting histories put into the same pot. On 28 January 2019, a special allocation draw was held which placed each country into one of the two semi-finals, as well as which half of the show they would perform in. Cyprus was placed into the first semi-final, to be held on 14 May 2019, and was scheduled to perform in the first half of the show.

Once all the competing songs for the 2019 contest had been released, the running order for the semi-finals was decided by the shows' producers rather than through another draw, so that similar songs were not placed next to each other. Cyprus was set to perform in position 1, preceding the entry from Montenegro.

Semi-final

Cyprus opened the first semi-final, preceding Montenegro. At the end of the show, they were announced as one of the ten countries who qualified for the final. It was later revealed that Cyprus placed ninth in the semi-final, receiving a total of 149 points: 54 points from the televoting and 95 points from the juries.

Voting
Voting during the three shows involved each country awarding two sets of points from 1-8, 10 and 12: one from their professional jury and the other from televoting. Each nation's jury consisted of five music industry professionals who are citizens of the country they represent, with their names published before the contest to ensure transparency. This jury judged each entry based on: vocal capacity; the stage performance; the song's composition and originality; and the overall impression by the act. In addition, no member of a national jury was permitted to be related in any way to any of the competing acts in such a way that they cannot vote impartially and independently. The individual rankings of each jury member as well as the nation's televoting results will be released shortly after the grand final.

The audience audibly booed Cyprus awarding Greece the maximum twelve points.

Points awarded to Cyprus

Points awarded by Cyprus

Detailed voting results
The following members composed the Cypriot jury:
 Despo Karpi (jury chairperson)senior officeer CyBC
 Christos Panayioti Pieri (DJ Chris P)radio producer, DJ
 Lisa Tsangaridouballet teacher, choreographer
 Stefanos Andreas Arestismusician
 Andrie Michael Danieljournalist, editor in chief

References

2019
Countries in the Eurovision Song Contest 2019
Eurovision